North Lincolnshire Council is the local authority of North Lincolnshire. It is a unitary authority, having the powers of a non-metropolitan county and district council combined. It is one of fifty five unitary authorities. It provides a full range of local government services including Council Tax billing, libraries, social services, processing planning applications, waste collection and disposal, and it is a local education authority.

Powers and functions
The local authority derives its powers and functions from the Local Government Act 1972 and subsequent legislation. For the purposes of local government, North Lincolnshire is within a non-metropolitan area of England. As a unitary authority, North Lincolnshire Council has the powers and functions of both a non-metropolitan county and district council combined. In its capacity as a district council it is a billing authority collecting Council Tax and business rates, it processes local planning applications, it is responsible for housing, waste collection and environmental health. In its capacity as a county council it is a local education authority, responsible for social services, libraries and waste disposal.

Political control

Wards and councillors
There are 17 wards, each represented by between one and three councillors.

Cabinet
The Cabinet of North Lincolnshire is made up of nine councillors from the largest political grouping. Meetings are chaired by the Leader of the Council. The Leader of the Council selects councillors to serve in cabinet posts. Meetings are open to the public. During the COVID-19 pandemic, these have been streamed remotely. The current cabinet of North Lincolnshire is as follows:

Leader Portfolio – Place Shaping and Connectivity: Rob Waltham

Deputy Leader – Adults and Health: Richard Hannigan

Children and Families: Julie Reed

Commercial: Neil Poole

Environment and Strategic Planning: David Rose

Finance and Governance: Elaine Marper

Resident Engagement and Rural Partnerships: Ralph Ogg

Safer, Stronger Communities – Ashby, Bottesford and Scunthorpe ('Urban'): John Davison

Safer, Stronger Communities – Rural: Carl Sherwood

Town and parish councils
Across the authority, there are a number of town and parish councils that operate on a local level. Council tax bills in the authority provide for the parish councils. In North Lincolnshire, there are 55 in total including eight town councils, three parish meetings, and forty-four parish councils. In total there are over 500 parish councillors in North Lincolnshire. Parish and Town Councils within the authority have signed up to the Parish and Town Council Charter.

References

Unitary authority councils of England
Local education authorities in England
Local authorities in Lincolnshire
Leader and cabinet executives
Borough of North Lincolnshire
Politics of Lincolnshire
Billing authorities in England